The 2018–19 season was Tottenham Hotspur's 27th season in the Premier League and 41st successive season in the top division of the English football league system. Along with the Premier League, the club competed in the Champions League. They finished fourth in the Premier League, gaining qualification for the 2019/20 UEFA Champions League. In the FA Cup Spurs were eliminated by Crystal Palace in the fourth round. Tottenham made it to the semi-finals of the EFL Cup with a face-off against Chelsea. After two legs the aggregate score was 2–2, however Spurs were eliminated 4–2 on penalties. For the first time in the club's history, they played in the final of the Champions League. In an all English affair Tottenham lost 2–0 to Liverpool at the Wanda Metropolitano in Madrid.

Squad

Current squad 
{| class="wikitable" style="text-align:center;width:80%"
|-
! style="background:#000080; color:white; text-align:center;" | Squad no.
! style="background:#000080; color:white; text-align:center;" | Name
! style="background:#000080; color:white; text-align:center;" | Nationality
! style="background:#000080; color:white; text-align:center;" | Position(s)
! style="background:#000080; color:white; text-align:center;" | Date of birth (age)
|-
! colspan="5" style="background:#dcdcdc; text-align:center;" | Goalkeepers
|-
| 1
| Hugo Lloris (captain)
| 
| GK
| 
|-
| 13
| Michel Vorm
| 
| GK
| 
|-
| 22
| Paulo Gazzaniga
| 
| GK
| 
|-
! colspan="5" style="background:#dcdcdc; text-align:center;" | Defenders
|-
| 2
| Kieran Trippier
| 
| RB / RWB
| 
|-
| 3
| Danny Rose
| 
| LB / LWB
| 
|-
| 4
| Toby Alderweireld
| 
| CB / RB
| 
|-
| 5
| Jan Vertonghen (2nd vice-captain)| 
| CB / LB
| 
|-
| 6
| Davinson Sánchez
| 
| CB / RB
| 
|-
| 16
| Kyle Walker-Peters
| 
| RB / LB
| 
|-
| 21
| Juan Foyth
| 
| CB / DM
| 
|-
| 24
| Serge Aurier
| 
| RB / RWB
| 
|-
| 33
| Ben Davies
| 
| LB / LWB / CB
| 
|-
| 38
| Cameron Carter-Vickers
| 
| CB
| 
|-
! colspan="5" style="background:#dcdcdc; text-align:center;" | Midfielders
|-
| 8
| Harry Winks
| 
| CM / DM
| 
|-
| 11
| Erik Lamela
| 
| RW / LW
| 
|-
| 12
| Victor Wanyama
| 
| DM / CM
| 
|-
| 14
| Georges-Kévin Nkoudou
| 
| LW
| 
|-
| 15
| Eric Dier
| 
| DM / CB
| 
|-
| 17
| Moussa Sissoko
| 
| CM / RM
| 
|-
| 20
| Dele Alli
| 
| CM / AM
| 
|-
| 23
| Christian Eriksen
| 
| AM / LW / RW
| 
|-
| 25
| Josh Onomah
| 
| CM
| 
|-
| 27
| Lucas Moura
| 
| RW
| 
|-
| 40
| Luke Amos
| 
| CM / DM
| 
|-
| 52
| Oliver Skipp
| 
| CM / DM
| 
|-
! colspan="12" style="background:#dcdcdc; text-align:center;" | Forwards
|-
| 7
| Son Heung-min
| 
| ST / LW / RW
| 
|-
| 9
| Vincent Janssen
| 
| ST
| 
|-
| 10
| Harry Kane (1st vice-captain)| 
| ST / SS
| 
|-
| 18
| Fernando Llorente
| 
| FW
| 
|-
|}

 Transfers 
 Released 

 Transfers out 

 Loans out 

 Overall transfer activity 

 Expenditure 
Summer:  £0

Winter:  £0

Total:  £0

 Income 
Summer:  £2,000,000

Winter:  £11,000,000

Total:  £13,000,000

 Net totals 
Summer:  £2,000,000

Winter:  £11,000,000

Total:  £13,000,000

 Friendlies 

 Pre-season 
Tottenham took part in the 2018 International Champions Cup with scheduled games against A.C. Milan, Barcelona and Roma. After the three games played by all teams taking part Tottenham was declared champions having accumulated seven points and the best goal difference.

 2018 International Champions Cup 

 Friendlies 

 2018 Costa Brava Trophy 

 Competitions 

 Overview 
{| class="wikitable" style="text-align: center"
|-
!rowspan=2|Competition
!colspan=8|Record
|-
!
!
!
!
!
!
!
!
|-
| Premier League

|-
| FA Cup

|-
| EFL Cup

|-
| Champions League

|-
! Total

 Premier League 

 League table 

 Results summary 

 Results by matchday 

 Fixtures 
On 14 June 2018, the Premier League fixtures for the forthcoming season were announced. Owing to delays in the completion of the club's new stadium, the first fourteen home Premier League games of the season were played at Wembley. Some fixtures were updated after Sky Sports announced their live TV coverage.

FA Cup

Tottenham entered the competition in the third round and were handed a tie away to either Tranmere Rovers or Southport. Tranmere Rovers won the replay 2–0 claiming the home draw to play Spurs. The fourth round draw was made live on BBC by Robbie Keane and Carl Ikeme on 7 January 2019.

EFL Cup

The third round draw was made on 30 August 2018 by David Seaman and Joleon Lescott. Due to Wembley Stadium not being available, and their new stadium not being complete, the third-round tie against Watford took place at Stadium MK, the home of Milton Keynes Dons. The fourth round draw was made live on Quest by Rachel Yankey and Rachel Riley on 29 September. The draw for the quarter-final was made live on Sky Sports by Jamie Redknapp and Jimmy Floyd Hasselbaink on 31 October. The semi-final draw was made live on Sky Sports by Piers Morgan and Peter Crouch on 19 December 2018.

UEFA Champions League

Group stage

Knockout phase

Round of 16

Quarter-finals

Semi-finals

Final

 Statistics 
 Appearances 

 Goal scorers The list is sorted by shirt number when total goals are equal. Hat-tricks 

Own goals

Clean sheetsThe list is sorted by shirt number when total clean sheets are equal.''

References 

Tottenham Hotspur
Tottenham Hotspur F.C. seasons
Tottenham Hotspur
Tottenham
Tottenham